August Nathaniel Lushington, (born August 1, 1869 - 1939), became the first African American to earn Doctor of Veterinary Medicine (V.M.D.) from the University of Pennsylvania School of Veterinary Medicine in 1897. He practiced about two years in Philadelphia and worked as an instructor in Veterinary Sanitation and Hygiene at Bell Mead Industrial and Agricultural College at Rock Castle, West Virginia. Later, he practiced for much of his career life in very segregated Lynchburg, Virginia, where he experienced unfair treatment, but he finally earned a reputation as a superior practitioner in the community. He had memberships in the Statistical reporter to the Bureau of Animal Industry, Federal Department Agriculture, and the Lychburg Chamber of Commerce.

Childhood 

Augustus Nathaniel Lushington was born August 1, 1869, in the south Caribbean on the island of Trinidad. As a young child, his paternal grandfather from DR Congo was brought to Trinidad as a slave to work at the sugar plantation on the island. Lushington's father, William, worked as a butcher, who raised produce for sale at market and did farm work.

Jobs and early education 

Augustus went to teacher-training school in 1875 and worked at Trinidadian classrooms for several years and was promoted to the rank of principal. However, he left for Venezuela, where he worked as a clerk in the town of La Guayra for a British-owned railroad. After three years, Lushington went back to Trinidad but found that opportunities were insufficient in the island, which were already crowded with successive waves of Indian and Chinese immigrants. Finally, in 1889, he left Trinidad again for the United States, seeking for broad and various labor markets. He landed in New York, where he set off for Binghamton, New York. In 1890, he met his wife, Elizabeth Gavino Hubert.

College education 

His college education started when he married his wife Elizabeth Hubert from Antigua. Her west Indian friends helped Augustus enroll in Cornell University to study Agriculture. He graduated with a degree in Agriculture in 1894.

Since there was no work for him at the time he left the West Indies and left for another education. He started another education at the University of Pennsylvania veterinary school. Finished the program in three years. When he graduated he was the only African American to graduate from the University of Pennsylvania. When students walk into the School of Veterinary Medicine at the University of Pennsylvania, the first thing they see is a portrait of Lushington. Lushington's portrait hangs at the main entrance of the Rosenthal building.

Job after college 
Augustus did his career of being a veterinarian treating farm animals. He did most of his work out of Lynchburg, Virginia, where he would walk miles to treat sick animals in farm country. Lushington set up a veterinary practice in Philadelphia but remained there for only two years. Lushington seems to have been drawn southward, despite the worsening racial climate in the southern states, by a teaching job in veterinary sanitation at Bell Mead Industrial and Agricultural College in Rock Castle, Virginia.

Deciding to return to his veterinary practice, he realized that south-central Virginia offered, from a veterinarian's point of view, an ideal environment, with large numbers of livestock grazing on the area's rolling hills. Finding that there was only one other veterinarian in Lynchburg, Lushington opened his practice there. Since there were not many pets at the time he decided to treat farm animals. The farms were important because at this time, most veterinarians treated large animals. House pets existed, but in a far less wealthy era when gourmet cat food was unknown, most people could not afford to spend large amounts of money on their ailments. Lushington treated cows, horses, and other livestock, often walking for miles through the woods from Lynchburg to reach the farms where his services were needed. His philosophy, according to Arthur Bunyan Caldwell's History of the American Negro: Virginia Edition, was that "the first essential to progress is a better understanding between the best elements of the two races. This, he believes, would lead to closer and more harmonious relationships; mutual confidence would grow, and both races would gain as all advanced toward better citizen-ship." In Virginia, however, Lushington experienced neither harmonious relationships nor good citizenship. White farmers often availed themselves of his services but then refused to pay him—and in the repressive atmosphere of the South in the early 1900s, Lushington had neither the option of taking legal action nor even the practical right to refuse services to deadbeats.

Extra Jobs 

Since his income was low and sporadic, he also worked as a meat inspector and a Probation Officer.

Personal life 

He and his wife had three daughters. One daughter, Drucilla Moultrie, taught in Lynchburg schools for about fifty years. Another daughter, Bernetta Parks, worked for Bennett College in Greensboro, North Carolina. The third daughter is not mentioned enough to find her records.

References

External links 
 Augustus Nathaniel Lushington: Veterinarian

1869 births
American veterinarians
Male veterinarians
American people of Democratic Republic of the Congo descent
Trinidad and Tobago emigrants to the United States
Cornell University College of Agriculture and Life Sciences alumni
1939 deaths
University of Pennsylvania School of Veterinary Medicine alumni